The Cincinnati Dockers is a United States Australian Football League team, based in Cincinnati, United States.
They are the 2016 Division-4 National Champions of the USAFL, and 5 time Division-4 National Champions.

See also

Fremantle Football Club

References

External links
 

Sports teams in Cincinnati
Australian rules football clubs established in 1996
1996 establishments in Ohio
Australian rules football clubs in the United States